Sharon Cuneta is a multi-awarded Filipino singer, actress and TV host dubbed "The Megastar" of Philippine entertainment and fondly called "Mega" or "Shawie" by fans and people from the entertainment industry.

Her success in the movies (53 starring roles & guest appearances in the movies, television (10 shows) and recording (40 albums) make her one of the most successful Filipina actresses. Her popularity has translated well into the field of advertising, where she is the highest paid and most effective Filipino celebrity endorser. Cuneta's long list of endorsements run the gamut from fastfood chain to bank, from make-up line to electronics, from ice cream to tele-communication company.

Cuneta holds the record of having the most number of Box Office Queen of RP Movies title (9 titles from 1984-1996). She was elevated to the Box Office Hall of Fame in 1990. She was also hailed as the Top Female Box Office Star of 1985 "Bida sa Takilya" given during the FAMAS Awards, 1986, for the success of her movie, Bituing Walang Ningning and was also awarded the 1991 Box Office Record Award for the movie Maging Sino Ka Man (with co-star Robin Padilla as co-awardee) given by the Greater Metro Manila Theater Association.

Television

Film

Film production

References

Cuneta, Sharon